Walter Klaunig (1893 – date of death unknown) was an early official of the Nazi Party in Germany. He was the first Gauleiter of Gau Brandenburg.

Life 
Not much is known of his early life except that he was educated as an engineer and employed as a salesman. On 7 December 1924, he unsuccessfully stood for election to the Landtag of Prussia, seeking to represent the electoral constituency of Potsdam as a member of the National Socialist Freedom Movement. This was a front organization set up during the time that the Nazi Party was banned in the wake of the unsuccessful Beer Hall Putsch. When the ban on the Party was lifted in 1925, Klaunig joined it (membership number 20,237). On 5 November 1925, Klaunig was named the first Gauleiter for Gau Brandenburg with its capital in the city of Potsdam. In February 1926, the designation was changed to Gau Potsdam. However by June 1926, Klaunig was removed as Gauleiter, though the reasons are unclear.

No replacement was named and, in October 1926, Gau Potsdam was merged with Gau Groß-Berlin and the expanded new jurisdiction (now named Gau Berlin-Brandenburg) was assigned to Joseph Goebbels. 

Klaunig was expelled from the Party sometime in 1928 for unclear reasons, though he was readmitted in 1932. After that, he fades from history and nothing is known of his later life or even the date of his death.

References

Sources

1893 births
Gauleiters
National Socialist Freedom Movement politicians
Nazi Party officials